Ada Cohen is an American art historian. She serves as Professor of Art History and Israel Evans Professor in Oratory and Belles Lettres at Dartmouth College. Her work focuses on ancient Greek art, particularly imagery of Alexander the Great. From 1990-1991, she was a member of the Columbia University Society of Fellows in the Humanities.

Works
 The Alexander Mosaic: Stories of Victory and Defeat (Cambridge University Press, 1997)
 ed. Constructions of Childhood in Ancient Greece and Italy with J. B. Rutter (American School of Classical Studies at Athens, 2007)
 Art in the Era of Alexander the Great: Paradigms of Manhood and Their Cultural Traditions (Cambridge University Press, 2010)
 ed. Assyrian Reliefs from the Palace of Ashurnasirpal II: A Cultural Biography with S. E. Kangas (University Press of New England, 2010)
 Inside an Ancient Assyrian Palace: Looking at Austen Henry Layard's Reconstruction with Steven Kangas (University Press of New England and Hood Museum of Art, 2017)

References

Living people
American art historians
Dartmouth College faculty
Year of birth missing (living people)
Brandeis University alumni
Harvard University alumni
Women art historians